Jane Emma Little (born 1972) is an English broadcaster and writer.

Biography
Born in Kendal, Cumbria, then in the county of Westmorland, she read Theology and Religious Studies at  King's College, Cambridge, graduating with a first. Later, she studied Journalism at the University of Central Lancashire and, on a Fulbright Scholarship to Harvard University, to study the connection between Religion and Politics.

In the United States during 1996–97, she was a producer for The World, a radio programme for Public Radio International (PRI) in association with WGBH Boston and BBC World Service. Returning to London, she became the first dedicated Religious Affairs Correspondent for the World Service, and subsequently presented many programmes for BBC Radio 4, including Woman's Hour and Sunday. She was a correspondent in Washington, DC, for the BBC during 2006–08.

As of 2013, she is a freelance working for both the BBC and The World from Washington as Religion Editor. She has written for The Guardian and other publications.

References

1972 births
Living people
BBC newsreaders and journalists
British journalists
Alumni of the University of Central Lancashire
Alumni of King's College, Cambridge
Harvard University alumni
Fulbright alumni